The method of spiritual victory, or spiritual victory method, strategy of spiritual triumph, also known as the spirit of Ah Q,  is a concept that Lu Xun criticized in The True Story of Ah Q as a self-comforting method.  When Ah Q was beaten or bested, he would use this method to comfort himself.  It depicts the mentality of Chinese people in a satirical posture, and also has a derogatory meaning.

Method of spiritual victory is a technique used to regain self-esteem by making oneself feel good through self-hypnosis, and self-anesthesia. Briefly, it is to describe those who have actually suffered losses, but can only shift to seeking self-comfort in spirit.

Method of spiritual victory has gone on to be often referred to as a reflection of a negative characteristic of the Chinese national character. It is broad in the sense that it is possible for everyone to use the spiritual victory method, even for self-comfort and to ignore the dissatisfaction of others.

Lu Xun used the "method of spiritual victory" to satirize the spiritual anesthesia of Chinese people at that time. In contemporary Chinese society, it is still alive and well.

See also 
 The True Story of Ah Q

References 

Psychological concepts
Chinese culture